Masterprize International Composing Competition, informally known as Masterprize, was an international composing competition founded in April 1996 by author, investment banker and former diplomat, John McLaren. The brief for the inaugural competition was "to find new and original works for symphony orchestra with artistic integrity with the potential for broad and lasting appeal". Additional specifications were that the compositional entry should be of a duration of 8 to 12 minutes and that composers could be of any age or nationality. For the 2001 competition, the submitted works had to have been scored for orchestral forces of between 50 and 90 players and have a duration of between 6 and 15 minutes. Composers who were awarded first place received a monetary prize of either £25,000 for the 1998 competition, or £30,000 for the 2001 and 2003 competitions, respectively.

The first Masterprize competition which culminated in 1998 was supported by significant institutions, such as the European Broadcasting Union, the BBC orchestras, BBC Radio 3, EMI Records, the London Symphony Orchestra, the BBC Music Magazine and the Worshipful Company of Musicians. The final round of the competition was held at the Barbican on 7 April 1998 where the London Symphony Orchestra under Daniel Harding performed the six finalist works in full. The gala concert was attended by Cherie Blair who presented the winning composers with their prizes.

Prize winners

References 

Music competitions in the United Kingdom
1996 establishments in the United Kingdom
Recurring events established in 1996
Awards established in 1996
Classical music in London